"Lovely Head" is an electronic song performed by British group Goldfrapp. The song was written and produced by Alison Goldfrapp and Will Gregory for the duo's debut album Felt Mountain (2000). It was released as the album's first single in May 2000 but did not chart. In November 2001, the song was re-issued as a double A-side single with "Pilots (On a Star)" and reached number sixty-eight on the UK Singles Chart.

In 2002, "Lovely Head" appeared in the Guy Ritchie film Swept Away. It appeared in Jan Kounen's 99 francs (2007), as well as in Pawel Pawlikowski's My Summer of Love (2004).
During 2001 the song was used in a TV and cinema advertising campaign for UK mobile phone company  One2One, which featured Gary Oldman. The song was also used in Arte documentary series about photographer  Helmut Newton, "Mein Leben" (2002). In 2000, the song was used by carmaker BMW in a commercial advertising its 5 Series (E39).

"Lovely Head" is used as the background music in most scenes of BBC animated television series Monkey Dust that contain the character Clive Pringle.

Background and writing
Goldfrapp began work on "Lovely Head" in September 1999 in a rented bungalow in the Wiltshire countryside. Alison Goldfrapp contributed the song's lyrics, and William Gregory and Goldfrapp composed the music together. The duo recorded the song outside their bungalow, drawing inspiration from nature. The song was originally titled "Your Lovely Head". "Lovely Head" features high lonesome whistling and cold vocals set to harpsichord and strings.

What is often mistaken for a theremin synth in the song is, in fact, Alison's vocals manipulated through a Korg MS-20 synthesiser. It was inspired by Welsh singer Shirley Bassey and Italian film director Sergio Leone.

In August 2009, American music website Pitchfork listed "Lovely Head" in their Top 500 tracks of the 2000s at number 493.

Formats and track listings

 CD & 12” single (UK) / digital single
"Lovely Head"  – 3:50
"Lovely Head" (Staré Město Mix) – 3:51
"Lovely Head" (Miss World Mix) – 3:50

Credits and personnel

Alison Goldfrapp – lead vocals, backing vocals, whistling, keyboards, songwriting, production
Will Gregory – synthesizer, keyboard, songwriting, production
Nick Batt, Chris Weston – additional programming
Adrian Utley – bass guitar
John Parish – drums
Stuart Gordon – violin, viola
John Dent – mastering

Charts

References

External links
 

1999 songs
2000 debut singles
2001 singles
Goldfrapp songs
Songs written by Alison Goldfrapp
Songs written by Will Gregory
Mute Records singles